James Thomas O'Dowd (August 4, 1907 – February 4, 1950) was a bishop of the Catholic Church in the United States. He served as an auxiliary bishop of the Archdiocese of San Francisco from 1948 to 1950.

Biography
Born in San Francisco, California, James O'Dowd was ordained a priest on June 4, 1932.  On May 22, 1948 Pope Pius XII appointed him as the Titular Bishop of Cea and Auxiliary Bishop of San Francisco.  He was consecrated a bishop by Archbishop John Joseph Mitty on June 29, 1948. The principal co-consecrators were Bishop Thomas Arthur Connolly of Seattle and Auxiliary Bishop Hugh Aloysius Donohoe of San Francisco.  On February 3, 1950, Bishop O'Dowd was a passenger in an automobile driven by the Rev. Henry Lande.  The car stopped on train tracks and was struck by an oncoming freight train and dragged .  Lande died at the scene and O'Dowd was taken to the Fairfield-Suisun Air Force Base hospital where he died the following day at the age of 42. His legacy includes his contribution to the Bay Area's Catholic high schools.

Legacy
Bishop O'Dowd High School in Oakland, California, whose establishment Bishop O'Dowd was in charge of planning for at the time of his sudden death, is named in his memory.

References

1907 births
1950 deaths
People from San Francisco
Roman Catholic Archdiocese of San Francisco
20th-century American Roman Catholic titular bishops
American Roman Catholic clergy of Irish descent
Catholics from California